Siyang County is under the administration of Suqian, Jiangsu province, China. It borders the prefecture-level city of Huai'an to the southeast.

Siyang is famous for its poplar tree. It is the earliest Chinese county and the Italian poplar tree were the highest poplar coverage of China as China polar tree industry county of the most developed county forestry of China and to learn the unique honor of "China YiYang township of" title of county the name. In addition, SiYang because has the Chinese unique poplar museum, and hold China unique YangShuJie which is famous and well-known.

Administrative divisions
In the present, Siyang County has 11 towns and 5 townships.
11 towns

5 townships

Climate

References
www.xzqh.org

External links 

 
County-level divisions of Jiangsu
Suqian